Else Marie Fisher-Bergman (1 March 1918 – 3 March 2006) was a Swedish choreographer, dancer, theatre director, and writer.

Career
Fisher wrote several children's books and theatre plays (including Beppo the Clown (Clownen Beppo), a dance pantomime directed by Ingmar Bergman, while working as a choreographer and director at various theaters in Sweden.

Personal life
Fisher was born 1 March 1918 in Melbourne, Australia. From 1943 to 1945, she was married to Swedish director Ingmar Bergman, with whom she had a daughter, Lena Bergman, before their divorce. She died 3 March 2006.

Filmography

Actor
1948 – Stanna en stund!
1950 – Två trappor över gården
1952 – Bom the Flyer
1956 – Rasmus, Pontus och Toker

Choreography
1956 – Det renaste ni drömt om...
1957 – The Seventh Seal (Det sjunde inseglet)

References

External links
Svensk Filmdatabas – "Else Fisher", Swedish Film Institute (Svenska Filminstitutet)

1918 births
2006 deaths
Choreographers from Melbourne
Swedish choreographers